SOKO Stuttgart (English title: Stuttgart Homicide) is a German police procedural television series that premiered on 12 November 2009 on ZDF. It is the eighth offshoot of SOKO München, launched in 1978 under the name SOKO 5113. "SOKO" is an abbreviation of the German word Sonderkommission, which means "special investigative team".

The first season of Stuttgart Homicide, consisting of twenty episodes, aired on ZDF from November 2009. In February 2022, filming began on the fourteenth season, made up of twenty-five episodes.

Crossover
On 3 April 2013, five SOKO teams were brought together for a five-part special titled SOKO – Der Prozess. In it, the teams from Munich, Cologne, Leipzig, Stuttgart, and Wismar have to solve the murder of a police officer. The five episodes were shown across Germany from 30 September to 4 October 2013.

See also
 List of German television series

References

External links
 SOKO Stuttgart on ZDF
 

2010s German television series
2009 German television series debuts
German crime television series
2000s German police procedural television series
2010s German police procedural television series
2020s German police procedural television series
German television spin-offs
German-language television shows
ZDF original programming